Spain is the second and final full-length studio album by American rock band Between the Trees, released through Bonded Records on August 11, 2009.

The album opens with the first single "We Can Try", which was released on June 30, 2009. The song also had a music video created and released along with the single. The album also contains "One Last Time (Darlin' II)", which is the sequel song to the song from their debut album, "Darlin'".

Track listing
 "We Can Try" — 4:03
 "Spain" — 3:55
 "The One Thing" — 3:41
 "One Last Time (Darlin' II)" — 3:21
 "Story of a Boy" — 4:21
 "Miss You" — 3:32
 "Move" — 3:09
 "Scarecrow" — 3:58
 "Gentleman" — 3:03
 "Changed by You" — 4:41

References

2009 albums
Between the Trees albums